A penumbral lunar eclipse took place on Friday, November 18, 1994, the second of two lunar eclipses in 1994, the first was a partial lunar eclipse on Wednesday, May 25. 

This event followed the total solar eclipse of November 3, 1994.

Visibility

Related eclipses

Eclipses of 1994 
 An annular solar eclipse on May 10.
 A partial lunar eclipse on May 25.
 A total solar eclipse on November 3.
 A penumbral lunar eclipse on November 18.

Lunar year series

Half-Saros cycle
A lunar eclipse will be preceded and followed by solar eclipses by 9 years and 5.5 days (a half saros). This lunar eclipse is related to two total solar eclipses of Solar Saros 152.

See also 
List of lunar eclipses
List of 20th-century lunar eclipses

References 

 Saros cycle 145
 

1994-11
1994 in science
November 1994 events